Diana Eng (born in Jacksonville, Florida) is a Chinese-American fashion designer, author and fashion technologist based in New York. She is best known as contestant on the second season of the reality television program Project Runway. Eng is a co-founder of an art/electronic group called NYC Resistor, and authored a book called "Fashion Geek".

Early life 
She attended Stanton College Preparatory School and later the Rhode Island School of Design (RISD). She graduated with a BFA from RISD in Apparel Design in 2005. In 2005, prior to graduation she participated in Seamless: Computational Couture, a fashion show hosted by Massachusetts Institute of Technology (MIT) with fellow RISD grad Emily Albinski, together they designed a dress that with the push of a button would inflate into a ball gown shape. Shortly after the Seamless: Computational Couture show, she appeared on Project Runway.

Project Runway
During the on the second season of the reality television program Project Runway, in the fifth episode, in which designers had to create a party dress for Nicky Hilton, contestant Daniel Vosovic referred to her as "Dirty Diana" because of the way she danced at the party.

Eng was eliminated in the sixth episode, during the Banana Republic challenge, along with fellow contestant Marla Duran.

In the finale, Chloe Dao picked Diana to help with the final challenge of designing an additional garment.  Chloe was selected as the winner of Project Runway Season 2.

Eng's work has been featured on the cover of i-D magazine and in The Boston Globe. Eng held a major fashion show after the success of Project Runway and had model Diana Georgie as the opening catwalker.

Work

Diana, who helped popularize the term "Fashion Nerd," earned top honors at Yahoo!'s 2006 "Hack Day".

Eng authored a book in 2009, Fashion Geek: Clothes Accessories Tech is a DIY book that teaches how to make electronic fashions published by North Light Books.

Diana Eng holds an Amateur Radio licence with the call-sign KC2UHB and has made instructional ham-radio videos. In March 2010, she joined the ARRL Public Relations committee.

In February 2010, she held a one-woman fashion show at Eyebeam entitled "The Fairytale Fashion Collection" featuring garments with EL wire, LEDs and various sensors.

In 2013, she was featured in CNN's The Next List where she demonstrated her use of integrated conductive thread that enables a dress to light up without any traditional wiring. In this episode, Diana Eng was filmed shopping for inspiration at CJS Sales in the garment Center of NYC

Eng is a contributor to Make (magazine) and Craft (magazine).

See also
 Chinese Americans in New York City

References

External links
Diana Eng biography at the Project Runway official site
Diana Eng blog
Diana Eng and Emily Albinski's fashion label, Black Box Nation
Diana Eng website
Diana Eng book

1983 births
Amateur radio people
Amateur radio women
American fashion designers of Chinese descent
American fashion designers
Artists from Jacksonville, Florida
Living people
Project Runway (American series) participants
Rhode Island School of Design alumni
American women fashion designers
21st-century American women